was a Japanese actor. He is most famous for playing villains and appeared in many jidaigeki and detective television dramas as a guest. He was a member of Yukio Mishima's Roman Gekijo Theatre Company.

He died of cerebral infarction on June 24, 2006, at the age of 74.

Biography 
Kawai voice type is baritone as a voice actor, he has been active since the early days of ateleco, dubbing James Dean and Marlon Brando in western movies, and playing orthodox roles that are the opposite of the villain image shown in period dramas. in particular, Paul Newman's dubbing was almost exclusively done after he was hired because of its "similar mood". he was also in charge of dubbing Toshiro Mifune, who appeared in the western film red sun, when Mifune himself asked him to "do it by all

Personality 
In private, he was a very friendly and calm person, not to be seen in Edo period dramas (children who were going to walk in the street shouted "He's a bad officer!" Even if he was called out, he never looked disgusting, and he answered by waving with a smile.) Kawai himself said, "Even if the children didn't know my name, they just looked at my face and said, 'He's a bad officer in a Edo period drama!'" I'm very happy as an actor."

Filmography

Films
 Bushido, Samurai Saga (1963)
 The Street Fighter (1974)
 Sister Street Fighter – Fifth Level Fist (1976)
 Mito Kōmon (1978)
 The Battle of Port Arthur (1980)
 The Man in White (2003)

Television drama
Mito Kōmon (1971~2003) 55 appearances as a Guest
Ronin of the Wilderness (1972) episode 12,32,65 Guest starring
 Kogarashi Monjirō (1972) episode 8 Guest starring
 Nemuri Kyōshirō (1972 TV series) episode 13 Guest starring
 Hissatsu Shiokinin (1972) episode 14 Guest starring
The Water Margin (1973)
 Taiyō ni Hoero! (1973~1976) episode 38,61,220 Guest starring
 G-Men '75 (1977~82) episode 113,144,199,221,245,296,351 Guest starring
 Hissatsu Shiokiya Kagyō (1975) episode 5 Guest starring
  Shin Hissatsu Shiokinin  (1977) episode 19,32,  Guest starring
 Abarenbō Shōgun (1978–2002)  28 appearances as a Guest
 Akō Rōshi (1979 TV series) (1979) as Fujii Mataemon

Dubbing
 The Sting – Henry "Shaw" Gondorff (Paul Newman)

References

External links

Japanese male film actors
Male actors from Kanagawa Prefecture
20th-century Japanese male actors
1932 births
2006 deaths